Arthur Charles "Nat" Robinson (28 February 1878 – 15 May 1929) was an English professional footballer who played as a goalkeeper for Small Heath / Birmingham, Chelsea and Coventry City. He also appeared for the Football League XI in 1906–07 against the Irish League and Scottish League representative sides, and played in two England trials. He made more than 300 appearances for Small Heath in all competitions. After retiring from playing he ran a pub in his native Coventry, and died in that city aged 51.

Honours
Small Heath
 Second Division runners-up: 1900–01, 1902–03

Notes

References

1878 births
Footballers from Coventry
1929 deaths
English footballers
Association football goalkeepers
Coventry City F.C. players
Birmingham City F.C. players
Chelsea F.C. players
English Football League players
English Football League representative players